The Orthodox Roman Catholic Movement (ORCM) is a Traditionalist Catholic group of priests founded by Robert McKenna and Francis E. Fenton, acting on the suggestions of Joaquín Sáenz y Arriaga and was the U.S. organization parallel to the Mexican organization Unión Católica Trento, founded by Sáenz along with Moisés Carmona and Adolfo Zamora. Fenton was a founding member of the conservative John Birch Society, and was on its American Opinion Speakers Bureau. The Orthodox Roman Catholic Movement established twenty-seven chapels in North America in which the Tridentine Mass is offered.

Origins
By fall 1975, the ORCM had gained Paul Marceau,  Charles P. Donohue, Leo M. Carley and Daniel E. Jones ("Dan Jones"), the English Benedictine Placid White, Joseph Gorecki and some other priests, totaling eleven, and services were being held in California, Colorado, Florida, New Jersey and New York. A growth period followed, and by 1979 a circuit system set up among the eleven priests offered the Tridentine Mass in sixteen states.

Current situation 
Among present or former ORCM members, besides McKenna (in 1986), it seems that Paul Marceau too had been consecrated a bishop, for he is credited with having performed the consecration of the Church of Our Lady of Fatima at Spring Hills, Florida.

McKenna died on December 16, 2015. The future of the movement is uncertain, with at least some parishes having been given to the Society of Saint Pius X.

References

External links
Our Lady of the Rosary Chapel - History

Monroe, Connecticut
Christianity in Connecticut
Traditionalist Catholicism